Akrofuom Senior High Technical School is a second cycle institution located in Akrofuom in the Adansi South District in the Ashanti Region of Ghana.

History 
The school was established in 1991. The first headmaster of the school was Mr. E. K. Osei. In 2011, the headmaster of the school was Mr. Peter Amponsah. In 2018, the assistant headmaster of the school was Mr. Jacob Anakpor. In 2018, Anglogold Ashanti Mining Company donated books to the Akrofuom SHTS and other schools in Obuasi Municipality.

References 

1991 establishments in Ghana
High schools in Ghana
Public schools in Ghana